In mathematics, the Bismut connection  is the unique connection on a complex Hermitian manifold that satisfies the following conditions,
 It preserves the metric  
 It preserves the complex structure 
 The torsion  contracted with the metric, i.e. , is totally skew-symmetric. 
Bismut has used this connection when proving a local index formula for the Dolbeault operator on non-Kähler manifolds. Bismut connection has applications in type II and heterotic string theory.

The explicit construction goes as follows. Let  denote the pairing of two vectors using the metric that is Hermitian w.r.t the complex structure, i.e. . Further let  be the Levi-Civita connection. Define first a tensor  such that . This tensor is anti-symmetric in the first and last entry, i.e. the new connection  still preserves the metric. The new connection also preserves the complex structure. However, the tensor  is not yet totally anti-symmetric; the anti-symmetrization will lead to the Nijenhuis tensor.

 
 still preserves the complex structure, i.e. .

So if  is integrable, then above term vanishes, and the connection

gives the Bismut connection.

Complex manifolds